Oxymeris albida, common name : the white auger, is a species of sea snail, a marine gastropod mollusc in the family Terebridae, the auger snails.

Description
The shell size varies between 25 mm and 46 mm.

Distribution
This species is distributed in Australian waters along Victoria and Tasmania.

References

 Bratcher T. & Cernohorsky W.O. (1987). Living terebras of the world. A monograph of the recent Terebridae of the world. American Malacologists, Melbourne, Florida & Burlington, Massachusetts. 240pp
 Terryn Y. (2007). Terebridae: A Collectors Guide. Conchbooks & NaturalArt. 59pp + plates

External links
 

Terebridae
Gastropods described in 1834